Theodore "Ted" Nicoloff, better known as Walker Boone (May 4, 1944 – January 29, 2021), was a Canadian actor. He was best known as the voice of the Nintendo character Mario in the DIC-produced animated series The Adventures of Super Mario Bros. 3 and Super Mario World. He also garnered minor fame for his role as Commander Lynch in Star Trek: The Next Generation.

Early life and career
Boone was born on May 4, 1944, as Theodore Nicoloff. He attended the McGill University Faculty of Law before embarking on a teaching career in Ontario and London. In the 1980s, he left his teaching career behind to take up a career in acting.

Personal life
He had two children, Jason and Larissa Nicoloff, one grandchild named Savannah and a partner known as Vicki. He also owned a farm which he was said to tightly maintain.

Death
Boone died on January 29, 2021, at the age of 76. News of his death was not made available to the public until August 11 of that year.

Filmography

Film

Television

References

1944 births
2021 deaths
Canadian educators
Canadian male film actors
Canadian male television actors
Canadian male voice actors
McGill University Faculty of Law alumni